Bjorn Meijer (born 18 March 2003) is a Dutch professional footballer who plays as a defender for Belgian First Division A side Club Brugge.

Career
On 19 April 2022, Meijer signed a four-year contract with Club Brugge in Belgium.

Honours
Club Brugge
Belgian Super Cup: 2022

References

External links

 Career stats & Profile - Voetbal International

2003 births
Living people
Dutch footballers
Association football defenders
FC Groningen players
Club Brugge KV players
Eredivisie players
Dutch expatriate footballers
Expatriate footballers in Belgium
Dutch expatriate sportspeople in Belgium